The Mars Climate Orbiter (formerly the Mars Surveyor '98 Orbiter) was a robotic space probe launched by NASA on December 11, 1998, to study the Martian climate, Martian atmosphere, and surface changes and to act as the communications relay in the Mars Surveyor '98 program for Mars Polar Lander. However, on September 23, 1999, communication with the spacecraft was permanently lost as it went into orbital insertion. The spacecraft encountered Mars on a trajectory that brought it too close to the planet, and it was either destroyed in the atmosphere or escaped the planet's vicinity and entered an orbit around the Sun. An investigation attributed the failure to a measurement mismatch between two software systems: metric units by NASA and US customary units by spacecraft builder Lockheed Martin.

Mission background

History
After the loss of Mars Observer and the onset of the rising costs associated with the future International Space Station, NASA began seeking less expensive, smaller probes for scientific interplanetary missions.  In 1994, the Panel on Small Spacecraft Technology was established to set guidelines for future miniature spacecraft. The panel determined that the new line of miniature spacecraft should be under  with highly focused instrumentation. In 1995, a new Mars Surveyor program began as a set of missions designed with limited objectives, low costs, and frequent launches. The first mission in the new program was Mars Global Surveyor, launched in 1996 to map Mars and provide geologic data using instruments intended for Mars Observer. Following Mars Global Surveyor, Mars Climate Orbiter carried two instruments, one originally intended for Mars Observer, to study the climate and weather of Mars.

The primary science objectives of the mission included:
determine the distribution of water on Mars
monitor the daily weather and atmospheric conditions
record changes on the Martian surface due to wind and other atmospheric effects
determine temperature profiles of the atmosphere
monitor the water vapor and dust content of the atmosphere
look for evidence of past climate change.

Spacecraft design
The internal structure was largely constructed with graphite composite/aluminum honeycomb supports, a design found in many commercial airplanes. With the exception of the scientific instruments, battery and main engine, the spacecraft included dual redundancy on the most important systems.

The spacecraft was 3-axis stabilized and included eight hydrazine monopropellant thrusters: four  thrusters to perform trajectory corrections and four  thrusters to control attitude. Orientation of the spacecraft was determined by a star tracker, two sun sensors and two inertial measurement units. Orientation was controlled by firing the thrusters or using three reaction wheels. To perform the Mars orbital insertion maneuver, the spacecraft also included a LEROS 1B main engine rocket, providing  of thrust by burning hydrazine fuel with nitrogen tetroxide (NTO) oxidizer.

The radio transponder designed for the Cassini–Huygens mission was used as a cost-saving measure. It also included a two-way UHF radio frequency system to relay communications with Mars Polar Lander upon an expected landing on December 3, 1999.

Deployed, the solar array measured  in length. Power was stored in 12-cell, 16-amp-hour nickel-hydrogen batteries. The batteries were intended to be recharged when the solar array received sunlight and power the spacecraft as it passed into the shadow of Mars. When entering into orbit around Mars, the solar array was to be utilized in the aerobraking maneuver, to slow the spacecraft until a circular orbit was achieved. The design was largely adapted from guidelines from the Small Spacecraft Technology Initiative outlined in the book, Technology for Small Spacecraft.

In an effort to simplify previous implementations of computers on spacecraft, Mars Climate Orbiter featured a single computer using an IBM RAD6000 processor utilizing a POWER1 ISA capable of 5, 10 or 20 MHz operation. Data storage was to be maintained on 128 MB of random-access memory (RAM) and 18 MB of flash memory. The flash memory was intended to be used for highly important data, including triplicate copies of the flight system software.

Scientific instruments
Pressure Modulated Infrared Radiometer (PMIRR)

The Pressure Modulated Infrared Radiometer (PMIRR) uses narrow-band radiometric channels and two pressure modulation cells to measure atmospheric and surface emissions in the thermal infrared and a visible channel to measure dust particles and condensates in the atmosphere and on the surface at varying longitudes and seasons. Its principal investigator was Daniel McCleese at JPL/CALTECH. Similar objectives were later achieved with Mars Climate Sounder on board Mars Reconnaissance Orbiter. Its objectives:
 Map the three-dimensional and time-varying thermal structure of the atmosphere from the surface to 80 km altitude.
 Map the atmospheric dust loading and its global, vertical and temporal variation.
 Map the seasonal and spatial variation of the vertical distribution of atmospheric water vapor to an altitude of at least 35 km.
 Distinguish between atmospheric condensates and map their spatial and temporal variation.
 Map the seasonal and spatial variability of atmospheric pressure.
 Monitor the polar radiation balance.

 Mars Color Imager (MARCI)

The Mars Color Imager (MARCI) is a two-camera (medium-angle/wide-angle) imaging system designed to obtain pictures of the Martian surface and atmosphere. The principal investigator on this project was Michael Malin at Malin Space Science Systems and the project was reincorporated on Mars Reconnaissance Orbiter.

The principal investigator on this project was Michael Malin at Malin Space Science Systems and the project was reincorporated on Mars Reconnaissance Orbiter. Its objectives:
 Observe Martian atmospheric processes at global scale and synoptically.
 Study details of the interaction of the atmosphere with the surface at a variety of scales in both space and time.
 Examine surface features characteristic of the evolution of the Martian climate over time.

Mission profile

Launch and trajectory
The Mars Climate Orbiter probe was launched on December 11, 1998, at 18:45:51 UTC by the National Aeronautics and Space Administration from Space Launch Complex 17A at the Cape Canaveral Space Force Station in Florida, aboard a Delta II 7425 launch vehicle. The complete burn sequence lasted 42 minutes bringing the spacecraft into a Hohmann transfer orbit, sending the probe into a 9.5 months,  trajectory. At launch, Mars Climate Orbiter weighed  including propellant.

Encounter with Mars

Mars Climate Orbiter began the planned orbital insertion maneuver on September 23, 1999, at 09:00:46 UTC.  Mars Climate Orbiter went out of radio contact when the spacecraft passed behind Mars at 09:04:52 UTC, 49 seconds earlier than expected, and communication was never reestablished.  Due to complications arising from human error, the spacecraft encountered Mars at a lower-than-anticipated altitude and it was either destroyed in the atmosphere or re-entered heliocentric space after leaving Mars' atmosphere.  Mars Reconnaissance Orbiter has since completed most of the intended objectives for this mission.

Cause of failure

On November 10, 1999, the Mars Climate Orbiter Mishap Investigation Board released a Phase I report, detailing the suspected issues encountered with the loss of the spacecraft.

Previously, on September 8, 1999, Trajectory Correction Maneuver-4 (TCM-4) was computed, and was then executed on September 15, 1999.

During insertion, the orbiter was intended to skim through Mars' upper atmosphere, gradually aerobraking for weeks, but post-failure calculations showed that the spacecraft's trajectory would have taken it within  of the surface.  At this altitude, the spacecraft would likely have skipped violently off the denser-than-expected atmosphere, and it was either destroyed in the atmosphere, or re-entered heliocentric space.

The primary cause of this discrepancy was that one piece of ground software supplied by Lockheed Martin produced results in a United States customary unit, contrary to its Software Interface Specification (SIS), while a second system, supplied by NASA, expected those results to be in SI units, in accordance with the SIS. Specifically, software that calculated the total impulse produced by thruster firings produced results in pound-force seconds. The trajectory calculation software then used these results – expected to be in newton-seconds (incorrect by a factor of 4.45) – to update the predicted position of the spacecraft.

Still, NASA does not place the responsibility on Lockheed for the mission loss; instead, various officials at NASA have stated that NASA itself was at fault for failing to make the appropriate checks and tests that would have caught the discrepancy.

The discrepancy between calculated and measured position, resulting in the discrepancy between desired and actual orbit insertion altitude, had been noticed earlier by at least two navigators, whose concerns were dismissed because they "did not follow the rules about filling out [the] form to document their concerns". A meeting of trajectory software engineers, trajectory software operators (navigators), propulsion engineers, and managers was convened to consider the possibility of executing Trajectory Correction Maneuver-5, which was in the schedule. Attendees of the meeting recall an agreement to conduct TCM-5, but it was ultimately not done.

Project costs 
According to NASA, the cost of the mission was $327.6 million ($ million in ) total for the orbiter and lander, comprising $193.1 million ($ million in ) for spacecraft development, $91.7 million ($ million in ) for launching it, and $42.8 million ($ million in ) for mission operations.

See also

 List of missions to Mars
 List of artificial objects on Mars
 List of software bugs
 Metrication

Notes

References

External links

Mars Surveyor '98 launch press kit 
Mars Climate Orbiter arrival at Mars press kit
Mars Climate Orbiter Mission Profile by NASA's Solar System Exploration
NASA Space Science Data Coordinated Archive
Mars Climate Orbiter Mishap Investigation Board Phase I Report - November 10, 1999

Climate of Mars
Missions to Mars
Space accidents and incidents in the United States
NASA space probes
Lockheed Martin satellites and probes
Destroyed space probes
Metrication in the United States
Spacecraft launched in 1998
Spacecraft launched by Delta II rockets